Dat Assawari was a frigate operated by the Libyan Navy. The ship was built by VT Group in the United Kingdom. It was ordered in February 1968 and delivered in 1973. The ship's design, the Vosper Mk 7 is a modified version of the  built for the Iranian Navy. The ship had an extensive refit in Italy by CNR Riva Trigoso 1979–1980 when new sensors and missiles were installed. During the refit, the ship was mined by unidentified swimmers. The vessel returned to service in 1983, but returned to Italy for repairs in 1984–1985 and 1989–1990. The frigate was reportedly scrapped in the late 1990s.

Design and description
Dat Assawari was a modified version of the Vosper Thornycroft Mark 7 design, based on the s constructed for the Iranian Navy. It was larger and had different armament than the Iranian ships.

Dat Assawari was initially armed with a triple Seacat surface-to-air missile launcher, a  Mk 8 gun, a pair of single Bofors  L/70 guns, an Oerlikon GDM-A turret mounting twin Oerlikon  guns, and a Mk.10 Limbo Anti-submarine mortar. The frigate's sensor suite comprised Plessey AWS-1 air-search radar, Decca 629 navigation radar, two Contraves Sea Hunter fire-control radars and Types 162, 170 and 174 sonar.

Modifications
During the 1979–1981 refit, Dat Assawaris armament and sensors were both modified. The Limbo mortar was removed, its well plated over, and four single Mk I Otomat anti-ship missiles and two triple  ASW torpedo tubes fitted in the space thus created. The Seacat launcher was replaced by a quadruple launcher for Aspide surface-to-air missiles. The complete sensor suite was replaced by Decca TM 1229 navigation radar, Selenia RAN-10S and RAN-12L/X air/surface search radars, two Italian fire-control radars, Thomson-CSF Diodon sonar and an Italian combat date information system were installed.

Construction and career
Dat Assawari was ordered by Libya from Vosper Thornycroft in February 1968. The frigate was laid down on 27 September 1968 and launched on 13 October 1969. Following sea trials the ship performed work up training at Portland, United Kingdom. The ship sailed for Tripoli in 1973 and was commissioned on 1 February 1973. In 1979, the frigate underwent modernisation at CNR Riva Trigoso, Italy. On 29 October 1980, while undergoing modernisation, the vessel was rocked by an explosion. The vessel had been mined by swimmers suspected of being of French origin. Despite the setback, the vessel's modernisation was completed after sea trials in 1983. The following year, Dat Assawari returned to Italy to undergo engine repairs which were completed in 1985. By 1989, the vessel had returned to Italy again, in a partially disarmed and non-operational state.

Citations

Sources
 
 
 
 
 

Ships built in Southampton
1969 ships
Frigates of the Libyan Navy